Corporal is an American folk-rock band. Corporal's members include Michael Shannon (guitar, vocals, lyrics), Ray Rizzo (guitar, drums, vocals) Robert Beitzel (guitar) and Matt Scobee (bass).

History
Corporal were formed in 2002. Their first album, Corporal, was recorded over 14 days. However, it took 18 months to complete due to the band members' different schedules.

Discography
Corporal (2010)

References

External links
 Corporal (official website)
 Corporal on Soundcloud
 Moose Lamp Recordings
 A.V. Club article about Corporal 
 

American folk rock groups
Musical groups from Louisville, Kentucky
Rock music groups from Kentucky
2002 establishments in Kentucky